Qəribli (also, Garibli, Garibly, and Gyaribli) is a village and municipality in the Tovuz Rayon of Azerbaijan.  It has a population of 2,121.  The municipality consists of the villages of Qəribli, Bala Şamlıq, Böyük Şamlıq, Dəlləkli, Öskən, and Hətəmlər.

References 

Populated places in Tovuz District